The following list shows the readings of the maximum and minimum temperatures for each year from 1862 to the present, recorded in the weather station of the Collegio Romano in Rome, established in 1788. The station, actually located in the Italian territory, was opened when Rome was part of the Papal States. The first weather station in the Vatican state was opened only in 2009, and is placed in the Palace of the Governorate of Vatican City.

Year by Year Temperature Extremes

Notes

External links
Temperature readings for Collegio Romano (1993-2011)
Annual absolute maximum and minimum temperatures of the Collegio Romano station from 1862 to 2012 (APAT)
Meteorologia di Roma - Anno 2011

Climate of Vatican City
Vatican City-related lists
Vatican